The Wheeler Independent School District is a public school district in Wheeler County, Texas, United States, based in Wheeler, Texas. The district extends into a small portion of Gray County.

In 2009, the school district was rated "academically acceptable" by the Texas Education Agency.

Schools
The Wheeler Independent School District has one elementary school, one middle school, and one high school.

Elementary schools 
Thomas R. Helton Elementary

Middle schools
Wheeler Junior High School

High schools
Wheeler High School (Texas)

References

External links
 Wheeler ISD

School districts in Wheeler County, Texas
School districts in Gray County, Texas